Lyndon Needs is a guitarist from South Wales. He is best known as lead guitarist of a Teddy Boy band Crazy Cavan and the Rhythm Rockers. Needs is a founding member of Crazy Cavan and the Rhythm Rockers and known as wildly extrovert showman guitarist. He has also made solo albums.

Discography

With Crazy Cavan and the Rhythm Rockers
LPs

CDs

Solo albums

References

External links 
Lyndon Needs at Myspace
Lyndon Needs discography at Discogs
Crazycavan.com
Crazy Cavan Fan Club

British rockabilly musicians
British rock guitarists
British male guitarists
Welsh rock musicians
Welsh guitarists
Living people
Year of birth missing (living people)